The Norwegian Constituent Assembly (in Norwegian Grunnlovsforsamlingen, also known as Riksforsamlingen) is the name given to the 1814 constitutional assembly at Eidsvoll in Norway, that adopted the Norwegian Constitution and formalised the dissolution of the union with Denmark. In Norway, it is often just referred to as Eidsvollsforsamlingen, which means The Assembly of Eidsvoll.

The Assembly
The election started in February 1814 in Christiania (now Oslo) in order to draft the Norwegian Constitution.

The Assembly gathered at the manor house at Eidsvoll (Eidsvollsbygningen) and became known as "The Men of Eidsvoll" (Eidsvollsmennene).

They first met on 10 April by Eidsvoll Church before the assembly formally opened the next day. It was intended to be composed of delegates from the entire country but the northernmost parts were not represented because of the long distances and lack of time.

 
The presidents and vice presidents of the assembly were chosen for one week at a time. The presidents were: Peder Anker (10–17 April), Diderik Hegermann (18–24 April), Jens Schou Fabricius (25 April-1 May), Christian Adolph Diriks (2–8 May), Christian Magnus Falsen (9–16 May) and Georg Sverdrup (17–20 May). Wilhelm Frimann Koren Christie was the assembly's permanent secretary. The Assembly agreed upon the text of the Constitution on 17 May 1814 which from the 1820s began to be celebrated as Norway's National Day although the document was actually signed and dated on the 18th. Sverdrup, who was the last president, gave the final speech. The assembly members departed on 20 May with the oath "United and loyal until the mountains of Dovre crumble!"

Background
Forced in early 1814 to sign the Treaty of Kiel as an ally of France in the later phase of the Napoleonic Wars, the King of Denmark-Norway had to cede Norway to the King of Sweden. The people of Norway, never consulted, objected to the royal sell-out. The vice-roy and heir presumptive of Denmark-Norway, Christian Frederik, took the lead in an insurrection and called a Constitutional Assembly at Eidsvoll. The Norwegian Constitution of 17 May formalised Norway’s independence after more than 400 years of union with Denmark. On the same day, Christian Frederik was elected King of Norway. As a result of this, Sweden invaded Norway. After a campaign of two weeks, a peace treaty (The Convention of Moss) was concluded. King Christian Frederik was forced to abdicate, but Norway remained nominally independent and kept its Constitution with only such amendments as were required to allow it to enter into a loose personal union with Sweden. On 4 November, the Storting amended the Constitution accordingly, and elected the Swedish king King Charles XIII as king of Norway. Although the two states retained their separate governments and institutions, except for the king and the foreign service, Norwegians grew increasingly discontented with the union, which had been forced upon them. In 1905 the union was peacefully dissolved, giving Norway its full independence.

Rumor about an African servant in a cabinet
In 2014 Aftenposten said that for over 100 years "many newspaper articles and history books" have retold a rumour about a boy in a cabinet. 
Supposedly in the spring of 1814 a small African boy kept himself in a corner cabinet and came out and attended to the tobacco pipes of the guests of the manor. 
The presence of such a servant is not mentioned in letters or diary notes of any of the delegates.

See also
 List of members of the Norwegian Constitutional Assembly
 Constitution of Norway
 Norway in 1814
 Norwegian Constitution Day
 History of Norway

Note
 This article is based on a translation of an article from the Norwegian Wikipedia

References

Other sources
Andenæs, Johs. (2006)  Statsforfatningen i Norge (Oslo: Universitetsforlaget)  
Frydenlund, Bård (2014): Spillet om Norge. Det politiske året 1814. 
Gisle, Jon  (2010) Jusleksikon (Oslo: Kunnskapsforlaget) 
Glenthøj, Rasmus & Morten Nordhagen Ottosen (2014) 1814: Krig, nederlag, frihed. Danmark-Norge under Napoleonskrigene (Copenhagen: Gads forlag) 
Holme, Jørn  (2014)  De kom fra alle kanter - Eidsvollsmennene og deres hus (Oslo: Cappelen Damm)  
Hommerstad, Marthe & Morten Nordhagen Ottosen (2014) Ideal og realitet. 1814 i politisk praksis for folk og elite (Oslo: Akademika forlag) 
Ottosen, Morten Nordhagen & Rasmus Glenthøj (2012) Samfunn i krig. Norden 1808-09 (Oslo: Akademika forlag)

External links
Original text of the Norwegian Constitution (1814)
The ‘Eidsvollsmennene’ (names and regions of the delegates)
The ‘Eidsvollsbygningen’

1814 in Norway
Political history of Norway
Constituent assemblies
Norwegian nationalism
1814 in politics